An  is the lodging house/drinking establishment to which a  or geisha is affiliated with during her career as a geisha. The  is typically run by the "mother" of the house, who handles a geisha's engagements, the development of her skills, and funds her training through a particular teahouse.

A geisha's engagements at parties, and her lessons in singing, traditional dance, musical instruments and tea ceremony are also booked through her .

Living arrangements
Many geisha, particularly those working in more traditional geisha communities such as those found in Kyoto, live within the  they are affiliated with, though some working in other areas of Japan – such as the geisha of Tokyo – are more likely to commute in from their own apartment.

Financial arrangements
The financial arrangements of a geisha's affiliation with her  varies; a geisha may start her career by borrowing everything from her , including room and board and her kimono, and may pay this back over time. A geisha under this arrangement generally enters into it with an external guarantor, and requires the mother of the house to keep extensive and detailed records. Some  owners will not take geisha on under these terms, considering it to be too involved and too much work.

Geisha who do not begin their career in this manner, but have paid off all of their debts, are also referred to as being .

Owners
 are usually owned and run by women, who are referred to as "mother" by the geisha and  affiliated with the house.

Notes

References

External links 
 The Kamishichiken district's official site
 The Ponto-cho hanamachi
 The Miyako Odori's official site
 The Nagoya Odori's official site

Geisha